Lapot may refer to:

Bast shoe
Mikoyan-Gurevich MiG-105 "Spiral"/"Lapot"
Lapot - a legendary tradition of killing frail parents in the Serbian highlands, to avoid supporting them
 Lapot, a 1992 novel by Živojin Pavlović about the tradition